Paride Romagnoli (20 March 1909 – 10 August 1992) was an Italian wrestler. He competed in the men's freestyle lightweight at the 1936 Summer Olympics.

References

External links
 

1909 births
1992 deaths
Italian male sport wrestlers
Olympic wrestlers of Italy
Wrestlers at the 1936 Summer Olympics
People from Ticino
20th-century Italian people